Out of the Grave and into the Dark is Balzac's compilation album of their albums, Came Out of the Grave and Dark-Ism.

Track listing
CD
"The Grave - Dreizen"
"Zetsubou-No-Ano-Basyo-E"
"Season of the Dead"
"Inside My Eyes"
"Shi-Wo-Yubi-Sasu"
"The Pain Is All Around"
"Came Out of the Grave"
"Beyond Evil 308"
"Art of Dying"
"The World Without End, The Pain Is Not Around (reprise)"
"I'm Losing You"
"Beware of Darkness" (2004 version)
"I Know"
"Gimme Some Truth" (bonus track)
"Beyond Evil 308, Pt. 1"
"D.A.R.K."
"Blood Inside '68"
"Beyond Evil 308, Pt. 2"
"Gyakusatsu-No-Mukougawa"
"XXXxxx"
"I Can't Stand It Anymore"
"Yami-No-Hikari-E"

Bonus DVD
"D.A.R.K." (music video)
"Inside My Eyes" (music video)
"Season of the Dead" (music video)
"Marchen aus dem horrorwald" (short horror movie)
"Zetsubou-No-Ano-Basyo-E" (live at O-East)
"The End of Century" (live at O-East)
"Violent Paradise" (live at O-East)
"Monster 1" (live at O-East)
"Into the Light of the 13 Dark Night" (live at O-East)
"Eerie Night" (audio-only bonus track)
"Taste of Blood" (audio-only bonus track)
"Horrorwood" (audio-only bonus track)
"Inside My Eyes" (unreleased version) (audio-only bonus track)
"Season of the Dead" (single version) (audio-only bonus track)

Credits
 Hirosuke - vocals
 Atsushi - guitar
 Akio - bass guitar
 Takayuki - drums

Balzac (band) albums
2005 compilation albums
Horror punk compilation albums